David Lloyd Brazil (March 25, 1936 – March 10, 2017) was an American football coach who last served with the New York Giants under head coach Jim Fassel. He was the last defensive coordinator for Chuck Noll with the Pittsburgh Steelers from 1990–91.

Personal life
Brazil and his wife Bridget had six children, Kathleen, Mary Ann, Michael, Daniel, Thomas and Patrick.

References 

1936 births
2017 deaths
National Football League defensive coordinators
Pittsburgh Steelers coaches
New York Giants coaches
Kansas City Chiefs coaches